For people with the surname, see Bouchot (surname).

The Bouchot is a river in the French region of Grand Est which flows in the Vosges department. It is a right tributary of the Moselotte, and thus a sub-tributary of the Rhine via the Moselotte and the Moselle.

Geography 
The Bouchot rises in the Massif des Vosges, on a flank of the Tête de Grouvelin, a peak located within the commune of Gérardmer in the Bas-Rupts section. The Bouchot is thus also known as the ruisseau des Hauts-Rupts from its source to its confluence with the ruisseau des Bas-Rupts. It flows through Rochesson, follows Gerbamont, then flows into Sapois where the ruisseau de Menaurupt joins its right bank. After flowing through Vagney, it joins the right bank of the Moselotte.

Hydrology 
The Bouchot's specific flow rate thus comes in very high, at 34.45 litres per second per square kilometre of watershed.

Main tributaries

 Ruisseau des Bas Rupts 
 Ruisseau de Creusegoutte
 Ruisseau de Noire-goutte
 Goutte de Jossonfaing
 Goutte de Battion
 Goutte de Plainfaing
 Goutte de Frimont
 Goutte du Herray
 Ruisseau de Peute-goutte
 Goutte Mathias
 Ruisseau de Menaurupt
 Ruisseau des Naufaings

See also
 List of rivers of France

External links
  Artistic photographs of cascades of the Vosges

References

Rivers of Vosges (department)
Rivers of Grand Est
Rivers of France